CATALYST Magazine is a free alternative monthly tabloid-paged magazine published in Salt Lake City, Utah. It was founded in 1982 by Greta Belanger deJong, Victoria Fugit, Lezlee Spilsbury, Don Ashton and Lucy Powell.

The magazine organizes annual Clean Air Solutions Fair.

References

External links

1982 establishments in Utah
Alternative magazines
Free magazines
Magazines established in 1982
Magazines published in Utah
Mass media in Salt Lake City
Monthly magazines published in the United States